"Bags" is a song recorded by American singer-songwriter Clairo. Fader Label released it as the first single from her debut studio album Immunity on May 24, 2019. The song features drums from Danielle Haim, and was produced by Rostam Batmanglij and Clairo, who also wrote the song. It gained over 20 million streams in 2019, and was nominated for "Song of the Year" at the 2019 Boston Music Awards. "Bags" was ranked at No. 5 on the list of Hottest Records of the Year by BBC Radio 1 alongside songs like "bad guy" by Billie Eilish, "Juice" by Lizzo and "Earfquake" by Tyler, the Creator.

Background
Clairo made her second television appearance performing the song on The Ellen DeGeneres Show in October 2019. Dominic Fike performed a cover of the song on Triple J's Like a Version on October 18, 2019.

Composition and lyrics 
An indie pop song,  "Bags" draws inspiration from Clairo's first romantic experiences with a girl. She tackles the line between friend and lover with a crush who could possibly be straight. Clairo wonders if the feelings between them are mutual and whether she should make the first move when she sings "Can you see me? I'm waiting for the right time/ I can't read you, but if you want the pleasure's all mine." "The whole song has this nervous energy," Clairo told NME, saying that the song has "a mix of really calculated parts to reflect the calculated energy you have in a first experience with someone,"

Harry Todd from Paste praised "Bags" for its layers, stating that "A set of simple guitar chords, understated drum fills, plunking keys" are familiar elements of Clairo's music. Shaad d'Souza from The FADER described the song as a "gently strummed track" that "builds to a peak augmented by warped guitars and piano."

BroadwayWorld noted that the song gives a "glimpse into the artist's growth both as a young queer woman, straight out of college". Rachel Hammermueller from Earmilk claims that the song "explores an adult relationship while still having a fresh background mixing".

Critical reception

Accolades 
At the end of 2019, "Bags" appeared on a number of critics' lists ranking the year's top songs.

Mid-year lists

Year-end lists

Decade-end lists

Credits and personnel 
Credits adapted from Tidal.

 Claire Cottrill – vocals, songwriter, producer
 Rostam Batmanglij – producer, recording engineer
 Danielle Haim – drums
 Emily Lazar – mastering engineer
 Shaun Everett – mixer

Charts

References 

2019 singles
2019 songs
Clairo songs
LGBT-related songs
Songs written by Clairo
Song recordings produced by Clairo